Nervous Cop is a 2003 experimental rock album by the group of the same name, consisting of drummer Greg Saunier and electronics musician John Dieterich of Deerhoof, drummer Zach Hill of Hella (and later of Death Grips) and harpist Joanna Newsom, released through 5 Rue Christine.

Personnel 

Zach Hill - Percussion, drums, art direction
Greg Saunier - Drums, mixing
Joanna Newsom - Harp
John Dieterich - Electronics
Jay Pellicci - Recording engineer
Carson McWhirter - Recording engineer

Follow up
Nervous Cop reformed with a new lineup in 2017 to record an 18-minute self-titled piece which was released for download through CASH Music and as part of Deerhoof's limited edition vinyl box set for Joyful Noise Recordings' "artist in residence" program. Saunier, Dieterich and Hill returned without Newsom and were instead joined by long-time Deerhoof vocalist and bassist Satomi Matsuzaki, guitarist Ed Rodriguez who joined Deerhoof in 2008, and Andy Morin of Hill's newer group Death Grips.

Track listing

References

2003 albums
Experimental rock albums by American artists
Noise rock albums by American artists
5 Rue Christine albums